Solid S.C. is a Sri Lankan professional football club based in Anuradhapura in the Anuradhapura District. The team plays in Sri Lanka Champions League, the top division of domestic football.

Achievements
2014–15 Sri Lanka Football Premier League, Champion
2013 Sri Lanka Premier League, Semifinal Play Off

League participations
Sri Lankan Premier League: 2013–present
Kit Premier League Division I: ?-2012

Stadium
Currently the team plays at the 2,000 capacity Prison Ground.

References

External links
 Solid SC for first time champions of Sri Lanka Premier League . Football Size. 15 March 2015. Retrieved 15 March 2015.
 Team profile at Soccerway
 Team profile at weltfussballarchiv.com

Football clubs in Sri Lanka